Vibroplex is the brand of side-to-side mechanical, semi-automatic Morse key first manufactured and sold in 1905 by the Vibroplex Company, after its invention and patent by Horace Greeley Martin of New York City in 1904. The original device became known as a "bug", most likely due to the original logo, which showed an "electrified bug". 
The Vibroplex Company has been in business continuously for 116 years, as of 2021. Amateur radio operator Scott E. Robbins, also known by the call sign W4PA, became the eighth owner of the Vibroplex Company on December 21, 2009.  The company is located in Knoxville, Tennessee.

The most common Vibroplex models have a single lever with a flat thumbpiece, or paddle, on the left side and a fingerpiece, or knob, on the right side.

The advantage of the key over a standard telegraph key is that it automatically generates strings of one of the two pulses from which Morse code characters are composed, the shortest one or "dot" (or dits), so that the operator's hand does not have to make the rapid movements necessary to generate multiple dots.   When the knob is pressed from the right, it makes a continuous contact suitable for sending "dashes" (or dahs). When the paddle is pressed from the left, a horizontal pendulum at the opposite end of the lever is set into motion, intermittently closing a set of contacts, sending a series of short pulses "dots" at a speed that is controlled by the position of the pendulum weight.  A skilled operator can achieve sending speeds in excess of 40 words per minute with a bug.

The Vibroplex Original Bug key has been in continuous production for over 100 years, with only minor cosmetic changes.  Numerous Vibroplex keys are available to this day; the company presently markets and sells 27 variations of Morse code keys, including the Original Bug, iambic paddles, the Vibrokeyer (an electronic variant of the Original Bug) and traditional straight keys.

See also
 High-speed telegraphy
 Morse code
 Prosigns for Morse code
 Telegrapher
 Telegraph key

References

External links
 Vibroplex Co., Inc.
  The Vibroplex Collector's Page
 Flash animation made by AE4RV demonstrating the operation of a Vibroplex
 Scott E. Robbins purchases Vibroplex Company, ARRL webpage, December 7, 2009
 Vibroplex mechanical bug key history

Amateur radio companies